Markus Alexander Uhl (born 31 August 1979) is a German politician of the Christian Democratic Union (CDU) who has been serving as a member of the Bundestag from the state of Saarland since 2017.

Early life and education 
Born in Cologne, North Rhine-Westphalia, Uhl studied business economics at the Saarland University.

Political career 
Uhl became member of the Bundestag for Homburg in the 2017 German federal election. He is a member of the Committee on Transport and Digital Infrastructure and the Budget Committee. In this capacity, he serves as his parliamentary group's rapporteur on the annual budget of the Federal Ministry of Justice and Consumer Protection.

In addition to his committee assignments, Uhl has been a member of the German delegation to the Franco-German Parliamentary Assembly since 2019.

In 2021, he was defeated for re-election by Esra Limbacher, but returned to Parliament on the list after the resignation of Peter Altmaier.

References

External links 

  
 Bundestag biography 

1979 births
Living people
Members of the Bundestag for Saarland
Members of the Bundestag 2021–2025
Members of the Bundestag 2017–2021
Members of the Bundestag for the Christian Democratic Union of Germany